Fernando Lima (born May 7, 1975 in Buenos Aires, Argentina) is an Argentine vocalist, classical music singer and countertenor, who rose to prominence for providing vocals for Spanish-language pop songs.

Life and career
Fernando Lima was born in Buenos Aires, and at the age of 10 moved to Madrid, Spain. He completed a degree in voice and saxophone at San Lorenzo del Escorial, in Madrid. He was enrolled in the graduate program at the Reina Sofía School of Music in Madrid. When Lima was 21 he moved to London, England to continue his doctorate studies in Baroque and Renaissance music and opera at Trinity College of Music; he also joined the Monteverdi Choir. In 2007 he signed to EMI Classics / EMI Latin.

Lima lived in México for almost 11 years, where he worked with several artists touring in Mexico and also performing in Canada, United States, Panama, Colombia, Venezuela, Belize, Chile, Argentina, Spain, Italy, France, Greece, Germany, the Netherlands and Austria. His debut album was released on February 5, 2008. He was featured on Sarah Brightman's song "Pasión", which became the theme song for the Mexican telenovela of the same name. The song is a duet with English soprano crossover singer Sarah Brightman, with whom he also recorded a second duet, "Ave Maria".

He is currently based in Hamilton Ontario, Canada, where is preparing his second album.

Discography

Album
Pasión (2008)

Single
"Pasión" Sarah Brightman, (with Fernando Lima) (2007)

References
Fernando Lima at Billboard.com

External links
Fernando Lima on Myspace
Fernando Lima Fans Forum (Unofficial)

Fernando Lima sings Nana

1975 births
Living people
Countertenors
People from Buenos Aires
21st-century Spanish male singers
21st-century Spanish singers